Denyse Wang Stoneback is a Democratic member of the Illinois House from the 16th district as of January 13, 2021. The 16th district, located in the Chicago area, includes parts of Lincolnwood, Morton Grove, and Skokie and includes parts of the Chicago neighborhoods of North Park and West Ridge.

Early life, education, and career
Stoneback was born in Skokie, Illinois. Her father was an engineer who immigrated from China and her mother was an ESL teacher at Mather High School. Stoneback was raised in Skokie and attended public schools. She graduated from Niles North High School and earned a B.S. in Criminology and Law Studies and a B.A. in Spanish at Marquette University. She attended Complutense University of Madrid and earned an MA in Spanish/English Translation. After the 2013 Sandy Hook Elementary School shooting, Stoneback founded the nonprofit organization People for a Safer Society, which "[raises] awareness, [educates] the public, and [advocates] for and helped pass gun violence prevention legislation." Her current occupation is an independent contractor for project management.

As of July 3, 2022, Representative Stoneback is a member of the following Illinois House committees:

 Appropriations - Public Safety Committee (HAPP)
 Housing Committee (SHOU)
 Immigration & Human Rights Committee (SIHR)
 Judiciary - Criminal Committee (HJUC)
 Mental Health & Addiction Committee (HMEH)

In the 2022 Democratic primary, Kevin Olickal defeated Wang Stoneback.

Electoral history

References

External links
 Rep. Stoneback Official Website
 Rep. Denyse Stoneback (D) 16th District General Assembly Page

21st-century American politicians
21st-century American women politicians
American politicians of Chinese descent
Asian-American state legislators in Illinois
Living people
Democratic Party members of the Illinois House of Representatives
Politicians from Chicago
Marquette University alumni
Complutense University of Madrid alumni
Women state legislators in Illinois
Year of birth missing (living people)